Apishapa River is a  tributary of the Arkansas River that flows from a source near West Spanish Peak in southern Colorado.  It joins the Arkansas east of Fowler, Colorado. A U.S. Geological Survey (USGS) station, #07119500, located along this river near Fowler measures the river's discharge.

The level and salinity levels of the Apishapa River are monitored by gaging stations installed at three locations along the headwaters of the river in 2007.

See also
List of rivers of Colorado

References

Rivers of Colorado
Tributaries of the Arkansas River
Rivers of Las Animas County, Colorado
Rivers of Otero County, Colorado
Rivers of Pueblo County, Colorado